The 1937 Arkansas State Indians football team represented Arkansas State College—now known as Arkansas State University—as a member of the Arkansas Intercollegiate Conference (AIC) during the 1937 college football season. Led by second-year head coach Leslie Speck, the Indians compiled an overall record of 1–5 with a mark of 0–3 in conference play.

Schedule

References

Arkansas State
Arkansas State Red Wolves football seasons
Arkansas State Indians football